Tony Hawk's Motion is a skateboarding video game in the Tony Hawk's series. The game, developed by Creat Studios and published by Activision, was released exclusively for the Nintendo DS on November 18, 2008.

Gameplay
The game uses a motion-sensing peripheral called the "Motion Pack", which is inserted into the Nintendo DS's Game Boy Advance game slot as the method of control. As well as skateboarding, the game also offers snowboarding.

Reception
Reviews were generally negative towards the game, with some critics complaining about the unresponsive controls from the Motion Pack and the fact that the game was rushed, offering little content. Motion holds an average score of 39 on Metacritic, based on 11 reviews.

References

2008 video games
Activision games
Nintendo DS games
Nintendo DS-only games
Skateboarding video games
Motion

Single-player video games
Video game spin-offs